
Tainter can refer to:

People
 Charles Sumner Tainter (1854-1940), engineer and inventor
 Jeremiah Burnham Tainter (1836-1920), engineer
 Joseph Tainter (born 1949), anthropologist and historian

Places in the United States
 Tainter, Wisconsin, a town
 Tainter Lake, Wisconsin a census-designated place
 Tainter Lake (Dunn County, Wisconsin), a reservoir

Other
 Tainter gate on a dam

See also
 Taintor, a surname